Latin epsilon or open E (majuscule: Ɛ, minuscule: ɛ) is a letter of the extended Latin alphabet, based on the lowercase of the Greek letter epsilon (ε).

In the Berber Latin alphabet currently used in Algerian Berber school books, and before that proposed by the French institute INALCO, it represents a voiced pharyngeal fricative . Some authors use ƹayin  instead; both letters are similar in shape with the Arabic ʿayn .

The International Phonetic Alphabet (IPA) uses various forms of the Latin epsilon:
 represents the open-mid front unrounded vowel
 represents the rhotacized open-mid central vowel

The Uralic Phonetic Alphabet uses various forms of the Latin epsilon:

Unicode
Latin epsilon is called "Open E" in Unicode.

See also
 Open O
 Writing systems of Africa (section on Latin script)
 Open-mid front unrounded vowel
 Greek Epsilon
 Reversed Ze Ԑ (Cyrillic script)

References

Ez
Ez
Vowel letters